Afghan Scene is Kabul's first glossy English magazine launched by MOBY Group in 2004. It is an eclectic mix of commentary, gossip, people, profiles and reviews, covering the diverse life of Afghanistan's growing expatriate and returnee community. Afghan Scene is published on a monthly basis in full colour. It is the most popular English language magazine in Afghanistan, distributed widely across major NGO offices, guest houses, restaurants and businesses.

Afghan Scene magazine provides essential information about what is going on in Afghanistan and in particular in the capital, Kabul. Afghan Scene attracts a diverse group of guest writers from renowned journalist Ahmad Rashid to writers like Frederick Forsyth.

References

External links
 Official site

See also
 MOBY Group

Magazines published in Afghanistan